The Mountbatten Centre is a leisure centre in Portsmouth, England, which opened in 1979, and was extended with a pool under a waveform roof in 2009. The "Mountbatten Centre" is located in Hilsea, an area in Portsmouth.

Facilities
 
8 lane 50 m pool
12.5 m teaching pool
150 station fitness gym
5-a-side pitches
Eight badminton courts
Basketball courts 
Two netball courts
Athletics track
Outdoor cycle velodrome 
All weather pitch
Café bar
Squash courts
Dance studio
Martial arts room

Notable sporting events

The Mountbatten centre has become a known venue in the UK, this is due to popular sporting events taking place there.

Sky Sports Boxing
Robot Wars
Snooker World Seniors Championship 2012 - 2013 
World Cup of Pool 2014
British Cycling
SER ASA Swimming Championships
Hampshire Open Fencing Tournament

Sports teams
Portsmouth City Smugglers - Basketball
Portsmouth Dreadnoughts British American Football Team. The Dreadnoughts are named after the famous battleship . The team trains and plays home games on the playing fields in Alexandra Park adjacent to the stadium.
Portsmouth Northsea Swimming Club - Home since the pool at Mountbatten Centre opened in 2009, Portsmouth Northsea has been going since 1929 and has international reputation through the likes of Olympic swimmers Katy Sexton, Gemma Spofforth and Paralympic athlete Lauren Steadman. Click here to view website

References

Snooker venues
Boxing venues in the United Kingdom
Basketball venues in England
Sport in Portsmouth
Buildings and structures in Portsmouth